Khutsishvili is a Georgian surname. It may refer to
Davit Khutsishvili (born 1990), Georgian freestyle wrestler
George Khutsishvili (1948–2013), Georgian public figure
Mikheil Khutsishvili (born 1979), Georgian football striker
Vazha Khutsishvili (born 1992), Georgian rugby union player

See also
 Khudsiani

Georgian-language surnames